The Scioto madtom (Noturus trautmani) was a species of fish in the family Ictaluridae. It is listed as extinct by the International Union for Conservation of Nature, which notes that it has likely been entirely or functionally extinct since 1957 given the lack of records since that year.

This fish was endemic to Ohio in the United States. Only one population was ever known; it was located in Big Darby Creek, a tributary of the Scioto River. Eighteen specimens were collected, all at one riffle in this creek, an area called Trautman's Riffle. It has not been seen since 1957.

References

Further reading
 
 
 
 
 
 
 

Noturus
Fish described in 1969
Freshwater fish of the United States
Fish of the Eastern United States
Endemic fauna of the United States
Fauna of the Plains-Midwest (United States)
Natural history of Ohio
Pickaway County, Ohio
Fish of North America becoming extinct since 1500
Extinct animals of the United States
Taxonomy articles created by Polbot